Fayetteville High School is a public high school located in Fayetteville, Arkansas. The school is administered by the Fayetteville Public Schools headed by Dr. John L Colbert.

The district, and by extension, Fayetteville High's attendance boundary, includes the majority of Fayetteville as well as the majorities of Goshen and Johnson and sections of Elkins and Farmington.

History 
The school was first opened in 1908, and the previous building was built in 1950 with further renovations made in the 1990s. Phase 1 of the current building opened in 2012, Phase 2 in 2013, Phase 3 in 2014, and the final phase opening in 2015. The current building, built adjacent to the University of Arkansas and just off Martin Luther King Jr. Boulevard, is also located on the Trail of Tears National Historic Trail as indicated by two roadside signs—one of them a government sign and the other a sign erected by the University. The school also has a TV studio from which they air the Bulldog Show on Channel 14. The school expanded to grades 9-12 in 2015.

The school was also the first school in Arkansas to voluntarily desegregate when, on September 11, 1954, African American students first attended the high school.

The school's marching band was selected to go to the Tournament of Roses Parade for 2006, which was only the second time an Arkansas band has attended.

The school recently underwent massive rebuilding and expansion with designs by architect Marlon Blackwell.

Academics 
The assumed course of study follows the Smart Core curriculum developed by the Arkansas Department of Education (ADE). Students complete regular (core) and career focus courses and exams and may select Advanced Placement (AP) coursework and exams that provide an opportunity for students to receive college credit.

Band 

The band has marched in many prestigious parades, including in 1989 the George H. W. Bush Presidential Inauguration Parade, the Fiesta Bowl, the Tournament of Roses Parade, the Hollywood Christmas Parade, the Macy's Thanksgiving Day Parade in both 1998 and 2008, and the 6abc Dunkin' Donuts Thanksgiving Day Parade.

Publications 
In 2017, Connotations received the Columbia Scholastic Press Association Gold Crown award, the highest award given to literary magazines.

In 2005, Connotations, the school's literary magazine, received a Superior award from the National Council of Teachers of English's Program to Recognize Excellence in Student Literary Magazines.

In 1993, 1995, 1997, 2007 and 2013, Connotations won the National Scholastic Press Association (NSPA) Magazine Pacemaker Award.  In 2006, Connotations was placed in the NSPA's Hall of Fame for receiving the highest rating that NSPA awards in its critique service twelve times in the schools' recent history

In 1994,  the Columbia Scholastic Press Association awarded Connotations the CSPA's Scholastic Gold Circle Awards for its Overall Design, Cover Design (Two or More Colors), Title and Contents Page, and Typography.

Athletics 
The Fayetteville Bulldogs and Lady Bulldogs are highly competitive in the state's largest classification, 7A, and are members of the West conference of that classification.  State championships include:

 14-time Boys' Golf (1950–52, 1959–63, 2004, 2013-2017)
 13-time Girls' Golf (1973, 1975, 1977, 1985, 2001, 2003, 2005–11)
 12-time Boys' Cross Country Running (1965, 1969–75, 1983–86)
 10-time Boys' Swimming (1972–74, 1976, 1978, 1981, 1985–86, 2000–01)
 8-time Boys' Tennis (1970, 1972–73, 1976, 1981, 1984, 1989–90)
 8-time Girls' Gymnastics (between 1998 and 2005)
 7-time Baseball (1960, 2003, 2006, 2007, 2008, 2009, 2013)
 6-time Girls' Basketball (1979, 1993–94, 2009, 2011, 2015)
 7-time Cheerleading (2000, 2006, 2007, 2010–12, 2017, 2019)
 5-time Boys' Basketball (1948, 1975, 1978, 1987, 2009)
 5-time Girls soccer, 4-time Runner-up (2002, 2004, 2006, 2009)
 5-time Football (2007, 2011–12, 2015, 2016)
 5-time Girls' Swimming (1976, 1981, 1999, 2002, 2018)
 4-time Volleyball (2012, 2015, 2016, 2017, 2020)
 2-time Dance (2016, 2019)
2-time Softball (2006–07)

In 2006, Sports Illustrated ranked Fayetteville High School in the nation's Top 20 High School Athletic Programs, stating:

"Located across the street from the University of Arkansas, this school has won a state-best 24 titles in 10 sports since 1996. The Purple Bulldogs’ girls’ gymnastics team has won eight straight state championships, and the girls’ soccer team took four straight from 1998 to 2001, plus one in 2010. Since 1996 the boys’ basketball team has made five appearances in the state semifinals and went to the title game in March. Fayetteville has also won four state championships in indoor track, which is not a recognized sport in the state."

2007 saw the Bulldogs win their first state football championship after 103 years of playing football, defeating Springdale Har-Ber 28-7 in Little Rock. Eight years later, they would duplicate the feat, defeating Har-Ber 28-7 again to claim their fourth state championship.

In March 2009, FHS concluded undefeated seasons in both boys and girls basketball and won 7A state championships. The girls finished 32-0 while the boys finished 30-0, with the boys carding a No. 8 final national ranking.

In December 2011, Fayetteville High's football team upset top-ranked Bentonville and broke their 25-game winning streak with a 29-28 overtime victory in War Memorial Stadium in Little Rock to win their second state football championship. On December 1, 2012, Fayetteville defeated Bentonville again in the 7A state championship game, 31-20, to become the first school in the 7A era to repeat as state champions.

 Controversy 
-On March 24, 2008, the New York Times ran an article accusing the administration and teachers of ignoring violence and bullying against Billy Wolfe, a sophomore who attended Fayetteville High School. After years of abuse, his parents filed a lawsuit against one of the bullies, and considered an additional lawsuit against the district, claiming that their son had been wrongly suspended and accused of being responsible for his own situation by school officials despite evidence that other students were responsible.

Some students had set up a Facebook group titled "Every One Hates Billy Wolfe" calling on them to attack him at school. One entry by a student on March 9, 2007 wrote ""Haha (your ) Billy got clocked today at school and I think one or two of his teeth got knocked out damn my friends are awesome"."

Fayetteville High School representatives responded by saying that, in these types of cases, if laws have been violated then the school reports the incident to the Fayetteville Police Department, and stated that the article was "casting our school district in a very bad and undeserved light."However, police records, Wolfe's mother, and Fayetteville Police Department Cpl. Craig Stout said an assault report was eventually filed by the Wolfe family, not the school. Wolfe's mother claims she begged the assistant principal of the school, Byron Zeagler, to call the police. "He said my son got what he deserved."Former Fayetteville Superintendent Bobby New said "We stand behind our administrators and believe they acted appropriately."Students at Fayetteville High School, in reaction to perceived bias in the New York Times'' article, stated when being interviewed by the local news that Wolfe "brings a lot of it on himself, that he actually picks a lot of the fights" and "that what he does, is he antagonizes the other person and starts the fight and when he loses he says 'Oh I got beat up.'"

In a local newspaper report the following week, a student claimed that Wolfe "likes to call him names, like stupid or retarded," and "screams in his ear, which is sensitive to noise because of his medical condition…[Wolfe] once pounded him in the back of the head several times with a medium-sized rubber ball."

Following the story's publication, the Fayetteville School District has reported receiving both a threatening phone call to McNair Middle School and an email which "suggested the district would be hit with some sort of Internet or computer network attack."

A decade ago a student attending Fayetteville High School's Vocational Campus was harassed and beaten for being homosexual. At that time the administration of Fayetteville School District had promised the office of Civil Rights they would adopt procedures to promote tolerance and respect.

Currently, Fayetteville High School has a Gay-Straight Alliance, which, in 2004 was picketed by members of the Westboro Baptist Church.

-Barry Gebhart, class of 1986. Coached basketball for FHS for almost 20 years and got promoted to Athletic Director of Fayetteville school district. He was caught in a sting operation trying to meet up with a 14 year old girl with sexual intentions. He also sent many inappropriate pictures to what he thought was a 14 year old girl that was actually a cop. 

-In 2016, several teenagers  rented a goat for $10 and recorded videos of the goat being abused at a party. The teenage boys broke open beer cans by slamming it on the head of the young goat. The situation made the news but there were no animal cruelty charges.

-In 2018, students were suspended for making racial slurs at another student during black history month.

-During September 2021, two teenagers were taken into custody after fighting on the campus. The entire school went on lockdown without much warning when several fights took place during lunch. The students were left in the dark without any information and held in their classrooms. One student was stabbed with a pair of scissors and one was pregnant.

Notable alumni 

Brandon Allen, Class of 2012 - quarterback for Los Angeles Rams, Jacksonville Jaguars, Cincinnati Bengals
Andrew Auernheimer, Class of 2003 - infamous internet troll
Nick Bradford, Class of 1996 -  basketball player, University of Kansas and European professional
Ronnie Brewer, Class of 2003 - University of Arkansas basketball standout, 14th overall pick in 2006 NBA Draft, player for nine seasons, most notably for Chicago Bulls
Michael Brisiel, Class of 2001 - player for NFL's Oakland Raiders
Sarah Caldwell, Class of 1938 (at age of 14) - opera conductor and opera company director; first woman to conduct New York Metropolitan Opera
Cody Clark, Class of 2000 - baseball player drafted by Toronto Blue Jays in 2000; played college baseball at Wichita State
Dre Greenlaw, Class of 2015 - football player for the San Francisco 49ers
Ronnie Hawkins - musician; The Band once played backup for him
Skip Holtz, Class of 1982 - football head coach at Louisiana Tech
Joseph Israel, Class of 1996 - reggae musician 
Sherm Lollar - MLB player
James Duard Marshall, Class of 1933 - artist, painter, lithographer, student of Thomas Hart Benton
Jason Moore, Class of 1989 - television, film, and Broadway director. Director - Pitch Perfect Movie. 
Blake Parker, Class of 2003 - baseball pitcher for St. Louis Cardinals
Savvy Shields, Class of 2013 - Miss America 2017
Wallace Spearmon, Class of 2003 — athlete, 2006 World Indoor 4 × 400 m relay gold medalist, two-time Olympian
Mary Kate Wiles, Class of 2005 - actress on Emmy-winning webseries The Lizzie Bennet Diaries
Payton Willis (Class of 2016) - basketball player in the Israeli Basketball Premier League

References

External links 
 

1908 establishments in Arkansas
Public high schools in Arkansas
Educational institutions established in 1908
School buildings completed in 1950
Buildings and structures in Fayetteville, Arkansas
Education in Fayetteville, Arkansas
Schools in Washington County, Arkansas